American singer Katy Perry has received various awards and nominations throughout her career. She is the recipient of five American Music Awards, 16 ASCAP Pop Music Awards, five Billboard Music Awards, four Guinness World Records, five MTV Video Music Awards, 14 People's Choice Awards, a Juno Award, a Brit Award, two Myx Music Awards, three NRJ Music Awards, and five Teen Choice Awards. She has also been nominated for two ARIA Music Awards, 13 Grammy Awards, two Q Awards, and five Radio Disney Music Awards.

Perry's second studio album One of the Boys was released in 2008 and received the 2009 NRJ Music Award for International Album of the Year. Two singles from the album—"I Kissed a Girl" and "Hot n Cold"—were nominated for the Grammy Award for Best Female Pop Vocal Performance in 2009 and 2010 respectively; the former's music video received five MTV Video Music Award nominations and the MTV Video Music Award Japan for Best Pop Video. She received several Best New Artist nominations, including one at the Los Premios MTV Latinoamérica 2008, and won the 2008 MTV Europe Music Award for Best New Act and also won the 2009 Brit Award for International Female Solo Artist. Her third album, Teenage Dream, became the first by a female artist to produce five number-one Billboard Hot 100 songs—"California Gurls", "Teenage Dream", "Firework", "E.T.", and "Last Friday Night (T.G.I.F.)". For the feat, she received a 2011 honorary American Music Award and an entry in the 2013 edition of Guinness World Record. The album was nominated for six Grammy Awards, including Album of the Year and Record of the Year for "Firework", and won the Juno Award for International Album of the Year.

Perry received the most nominations at the 2011 MTV Video Music Awards with ten, winning Video of the Year for "Firework" and Best Collaboration and Best Special Effects for "E.T.". She became the first artist to be nominated for four different videos at a single ceremony. Her single "Wide Awake" from Teenage Dream: The Complete Confection—a reissue of her third album Teenage Dream—was nominated for the Grammy Award for Best Pop Solo Performance. In 2012, Billboard magazine declared her the "Woman of the Year" for her contributions to music. Perry's fourth album, Prism, released in 2013, produced two Canadian number-one singles "Roar" and "Dark Horse". The former was nominated for Song of the Year and Best Pop Solo Performance at the 56th Annual Grammy Awards. At the following ceremony, the album received a Best Pop Vocal Album nomination while "Dark Horse" was nominated for Best Pop Duo/Group Performance. "Dark Horse" won Single of the Year at the 2014 American Music Awards. Perry was declared the Top Global Female Recording Artist of 2013 by the International Federation of the Phonographic Industry. She has been included in the Forbes list of "Top-Earning Women In Music" from 2011 to 2016, ranking among the top ten each year.

She was also honoured in November 2016 at UNICEF by Hillary Clinton, through the Audrey Hepburn Humanitarian Award.

Awards and nominations

Other accolades

Sources
Notes

References

Perry, Katy
Awards